Darius Jackson  (born December 1, 1993) is an American football running back who is a free agent. He played college football at Eastern Michigan University. Jackson was selected by the Dallas Cowboys in the sixth round of the 2016 NFL Draft.

Early years
Jackson attended Sparta High School in Sparta, Illinois. He was a two-way football player as a senior, registering almost 1,100 rushing yards, while playing quarterback, running back and safety. He received All-conference honors on both sides of the ball and was an Academic All-state selection. He also practiced baseball.

College career
He accepted a football scholarship from Eastern Michigan University. As a sophomore, he appeared in seven games (one start) and had 201 rushing yards. The next year, he appeared in all 12 games (4 starts), posting 295 rushing yards.

As a senior, he became a full-time starter and had a break out year, rushing for 1,078 yards on 208 carries (5.2 avg.), 14 rushing touchdowns, 21 receptions for 201 yards, two receiving touchdowns and 16 total touchdowns (school record).

Professional career

Dallas Cowboys
Jackson was selected by the Dallas Cowboys in the sixth round (216th overall) of the 2016 NFL Draft, in part because of the athletic traits he displayed during his pro day. He made the Cowboys 53-man roster, in order to protect his rights from being claimed by another team and was declared inactive in 14 games. On December 13, he was waived to make room for running back Darren McFadden, who was being activated from the Non Football Injury List.

Cleveland Browns
On December 14, 2016, Jackson was claimed off waivers by the Cleveland Browns. He was declared inactive for the remaining three games.

On June 1, 2017, Jackson was waived/injured with an undisclosed knee injury that forced him to miss organized team activities. He cleared waivers and was placed on the injured reserve list on June 2.

On May 3, 2018, Jackson was waived by the Browns.

Dallas Cowboys (second stint)
On May 30, 2018, Jackson signed with the Dallas Cowboys. On September 1, 2018, he was waived by the Cowboys and was signed to the practice squad the next day.

Green Bay Packers
On September 3, 2018, Jackson was signed by the Green Bay Packers from the Cowboys' practice squad, as the team was looking for a third running back, with Aaron Jones suspended for the first two games, and Devante Mays being released with an injury settlement. He was waived on October 6, 2018.

Dallas Cowboys (third stint)
On October 9, 2018, Jackson was signed to the Dallas Cowboys practice squad. He was promoted to the active roster on December 22, 2018. Overall, in the 2018 season, he had six carries for 16 yards, all of which came in the regular season finale against the New York Giants.

On August 30, 2019, Jackson was released by the Cowboys, then re-signed to the practice squad on September 11. He was released on September 16.

Indianapolis Colts
On September 20, 2019, Jackson was signed to the Indianapolis Colts practice squad, but was released four days later.

Tampa Bay Buccaneers
On October 9, 2019, Jackson was signed to the Tampa Bay Buccaneers practice squad. He was released on October 15.

Indianapolis Colts (second stint)
On November 12, 2019, Jackson was signed to the Indianapolis Colts practice squad. He signed a reserve/future contract with the Colts on December 30, 2019.

On August 2, 2020, Jackson was waived by the Colts. He was re-signed to the practice squad on September 16, 2020. He was released on November 3, and re-signed to the practice squad three days later. He was released on November 7 and re-signed three days later to the practice squad. He was released on December 1, 2020.

Las Vegas Raiders
On July 29, 2021, Jackson signed with the Las Vegas Raiders. He was waived on August 2.

Houston Texans
On August 11, 2021, Jackson signed with the Houston Texans. He was waived on August 23. He was re-signed to the practice squad on November 30, 2021.

References

External links
Dallas Cowboys bio
Eastern Michigan Eagles bio

1993 births
Living people
People from Sparta, Illinois
Players of American football from Illinois
American football running backs
Eastern Michigan Eagles football players
Dallas Cowboys players
Cleveland Browns players
Green Bay Packers players
Indianapolis Colts players
Tampa Bay Buccaneers players
Las Vegas Raiders players
Houston Texans players